Rhododendron arboreum, the tree rhododendron, is an evergreen shrub or small tree with a showy display of bright red flowers. It is found in Bhutan, China, India, Myanmar, Nepal, Sri Lanka, Pakistan and Thailand. It is the national flower of Nepal. In India it is the state tree of Uttarakhand and state flower of Nagaland.

Description
Its specific epithet means "tending to be woody or growing in a tree-like form".
and broad. This plant holds the Guinness Record for World's Largest Rhododendron.

They have black nectar pouches and black spots inside.

Cultivation
Rhododendron arboreum prefers moist but well-drained, leafy, humus-rich, acid pH soil, in dappled shade.

This plant is suitable for woodland gardens.

Shelter is imperative to prevent wind damage to leaves.

Variants

Rhododendron arboreum subsp. cinnamomeum has leaves with cinnamon-brown hairs beneath
Rhododendron arboreum subsp. zeylanicum rare ssp from the highlands of Sri Lanka, named after Zeilan, the name used by Arabian traders to refer to Sri Lanka
Rhododendron arboreum subsp. cinnamomeum var. album has white flowers with small blood red spots on the inner surface of the petals
Rhododendron arboreum subsp. delavayi has red flowers
Rhododendron arboreum subsp. nilagiricum (Zenker) Tagg is found in Tamil Nadu, India.

Threats
Rhododendrons are susceptible to vine weevil, rhododendron and azalea whiteflies, leafhoppers, lacebugs, scale insects, caterpillars, aphids, powdery mildew, bud blast, honey fungus, rust, leafy gall, petal blight, silver leaf, phytophthora root rot and lime-induced chlorosis.

In Sri Lanka

The plant is known as Maha ratmal, Maha Rath Mal, Asela mal in Sinhala. The Sinhalese name "rathmal" is mostly used for the Ixoras, which are not in this family. However, the Rhododendrons are not a common plant in Sri Lanka, and the unsystematic local name seems to be"Maha-rathmal", i.e., "Big-Ixora", applied to smaller varieties which are more like ornamental Azelias. Maha Rath Mala is commonly available in Horton Plain, Knuckles mountain range and many of the parts towards the center of Sri Lanka.

See also
Catawbiense hybrid – hybrid with R. arboreum

References

arboreum
Holarctic flora
Flora of China
Flora of the Indian subcontinent
Flora of Myanmar
Flora of Thailand
Plants used in Ayurveda
National symbols of Nepal
Symbols of Nagaland
Symbols of Uttarakhand